Frank Murphy (Frank Dwyer Murphy; September 21, 1889 – June 11, 1980) was an American track and field athlete who competed in the 1912 Summer Olympics which were held in Stockholm and where he won a bronze medal in the pole vault event in a three-way tie with William Halpenny and Bertil Uggla. In the pole vault event, Uggla and Murphy failed to clear 3.85 Metres with Halpenny previously withdrawing after breaking two ribs in clearing 3.80 Metres.

He was born in East Chicago, Illinois and died in Urbana, Illinois.

References

External links

1889 births
1980 deaths
Track and field athletes from Chicago
American male pole vaulters
Athletes (track and field) at the 1912 Summer Olympics
Olympic bronze medalists for the United States in track and field
Medalists at the 1912 Summer Olympics